The Circular Park; also known as the Youth Park, is a public park in the Kentron district of the Armenian capital Yerevan. It starts with the Cathedral of Saint Gregory at the south on Tigran Mets street, and ends up with the Poplavok lake at the north near Mashtots Avenue. The park lies along Khanjyan, Yervand Kochar, Alex Manoogian, Moskovian and Isahakyan streets, forming a half-circular shaped park around the eastern part of downtown Yerevan. The park has an approximate length of 2500 metres and an average width of 120 metres.

One of the designers and architects of the Circular Park from Teryan Street to Abovyan Street built in 1960-1985 was Sasun Grigoryan.

Famous structures in the Circular Park
The Circular park is home to many works of art including the statues of Aleksandr Griboyedov, Andranik Ozanian, Vardan Mamikonian, Yeghishe Charents, Tigran Petrosian, Mikael Nalbandian, Armen Tigranian, Fridtjof Nansen, Avetik Isahakyan and Vahan Terian.

The benefactors' walkway of the park was opened in October 2012 featuring the statues of 6 prominent Armenian benefactors: Boghos Nubar, Aleksandr Mantashyan, Alex Manoogian, Calouste Gulbenkian, Mikael Aramyants and Hovhannes Lazaryan.

Other decorative monuments in the park include: the monument of Friendship between Carrara and Yerevan, the Rebirth monument, the Waiting monument and the monument dedicated to Revived Armenia.
Buildings and structures in the park include: 
Saint Gregory the Illuminator Cathedral
Tekeyan Cultural Centre
Yerevan Chess House 
Tennis Club of the Yerevan STate University 
Komitas Chamber Music Hall 
Yeritasardakan underground station 
Poplavok lake and Aragast café

An indoor sports complex within the Circular park is under construction (as of 2013).

Gallery

References

Parks in Yerevan
Urban public parks